Matilda Scheurich (July 11, 1910 – July 1983) was an American swimmer. She competed in the women's 200 metre breaststroke event at the 1924 Summer Olympics.

References

External links
 

1910 births
1983 deaths
American female swimmers
Olympic swimmers of the United States
Swimmers at the 1924 Summer Olympics
Sportspeople from New York City
American female breaststroke swimmers
20th-century American women